The Route 66 Bridge over the Chicago, Rock Island and Gulf Railroad, in Wheeler County, Texas near Shamrock, Texas, was built in 1932.  It carried Route 66 traffic until 1960.  It now carries the south frontage road of Interstate 40 over the former Chicago, Rock Island and Gulf Railway right-of-way.  It was listed on the National Register of Historic Places in 2007.

Its main span is steel I-beams encased in concrete;  the other spans are reinforced concrete girders supported by reinforced concrete pile bents.

See also
National Register of Historic Places listings in Wheeler County, Texas
List of bridges on the National Register of Historic Places in Texas

References

External links

Historic bridge listed under "Texas"
Bridge Hunter
Bridge Reports

U.S. Route 66 in Texas
Girder bridges in the United States
Bridges on the National Register of Historic Places in Texas
National Register of Historic Places in Wheeler County, Texas
Infrastructure completed in 1932